Luise Gruber (born 27 June 1982 in Wels, Austria), better known by her stage name Saint Lu is an Austrian singer and songwriter. She currently lives and works in Berlin, Germany.

Recording career
Luise Gruber was a member of many short-living bands, including the school band "Joe Graham", the Big Band Neuhofen the show band "Connection" and the rock band "Djaleb". She has also mentioned in an interview that she has been a member of several metal and jazz bands.

In 1998 she was a part of a rock band called Luise Gruber & Zentao which was later renamed to Centao. Soon after the recording of the first demos, Gruber leaves the band. Two demos were recorded – "Pop 33, 34", a split tape with the band "Sick Orange" and "Promo '000".

In 2003 she was a part of the casting show "Starmania", where she ended tenth. She has recorded some cover songs for the compilation albums of the show. Soon after Starmania, she started working as a singing teacher at the music school "CreatiV".

In 2005 she has released her debut EP "One Step Closer" via "AGENTUR NETZWERK records" under the name Luise. The EP includes three tracks, two of which were written by Gruber ("Why Are You Under My Skin?" and "Left to Heaven") and the third one (Amazing Grace) is a traditional gospel song produced by The Alphabet. The EP saw no success. It is currently out of print and cannot be found at the regular stores or as a digital download. "Why Are You Under My Skin" was planned to be released as the first single from the EP.

In 2009 Warner Bros. Records signed her under the pseudonym Saint Lu. Her debut album "Saint Lu" was released on 20 November 2009. It includes songs, written or co-written by Gruber, which are a mixture of 70s Blues and Rock music. Critically acclaimed, the album failed to get into the top 20 in Austria, charting on place 30. Two singles were released after the release of the album: Don't Miss Your Own Life and Here I stand. In 2010 she performed two songs for the Austrian comedy series "Wir Sind Kaiser", called "Kaiserhymne" and "Heroes".

Gruber's second album, called "2", was recorded in 2012, and scheduled for release in early 2013. The album is noteworthy for its music direction change, from the blues and rock of its predecessor toward a more soul-oriented aesthetic. One of the songs from her second album, called "Falling For Your Love" written by Gruber with Jimmy Messer and Roxanne Seeman, was premiered on YouTube. Luise Gruber is taking part of the Eurovision Song Contest for 2013 with another song from her yet to be released second album, called Craving, which was released on 1 February 2013 as a digital download. A third song, "No One Loves You Like I Do", is available as a free download on her official website. Gruber confirmed on her official Facebook page, that her new album "2" and was released on 15 February 2013.

Influences
Gruber's biggest musical influences are Janis Joplin and Jimi Hendrix along with other 60s and 70s Blues/Rock artists.

Awards
In 2011 Saint Lu won a European Border Breakers Award at the European Border Breakers Award Ceremony at the Eurosonic Noorderslag Festival in the Netherlands for her international success.

Discography

Albums
 Saint Lu (2009)  No. 30 AT, No. 84 CH, No. 79 GER 
 2 (2013) #42 GER

EPs
 One Step Closer (2005) – Debut EP under the name Luise
 Acoustic (2010) – includes acoustic versions of "Don't Miss Your Own Life" and "Memory"
 2 (Acoustic EP) (2013) – a six track EP, including acoustic versions of songs from the "2" era

Singles

Other songs
Luise Gruber & Zentao (also known as Centao)
 “Hunt” – 4:02 (1999)
 “I've Got Your Number” – 3:51 (1999)
 “I Feel High” (2000)
 “Nothing Doing” (2000)
 “I'm Not Your Wench” (2000)
Starmania
 “Family Portrait” – Pink cover, for the compilation album Starmania – Die Neue Generation II
 “First Cut Is The Deepest” – Rod Stewart cover, for the compilation album Starmania – Die Neue Generation II
 “Hoamweh nach B.A.” – Ausseer Hardbradler cover, for the compilation album “Starmania – Die Neue Generation – Best Of Qualification”
 “Thank God It's Christmas” – from  the compilation album “Starmania – Die Neue Generation – Xmas hits”
 “In The Shadows” – The Rasmus cover, for the compilation album Starmania – Die Neue Generation I

References

External links
Official MySpace page of Saint Lu
Official Site

1982 births
Living people
21st-century Austrian women singers
English-language singers from Austria
Women rock singers